The Awoonor-Renner family or Awunor-Renner family is a Sierra Leone Creole medical, legal, and commercial dynasty with branches of the family in Ghana. The Awoonor-Renner, Awoonor-Wilson, Awoonor-Gordon families are branches of the Awoonor-Williams family that originated from Waterloo, Sierra Leone, and derived "Awoonor" from the Awuna territory in Keta. The Awoonor-Renner family has produced several distinguished doctors, lawyers, and businessmen in Sierra Leone, Ghana, and the United Kingdom. Alongside families such as the Dove family, Easmon family and Smith family, the Awoonor-Renners are among the wealthy Aristo or aristocratic Creole families.

Notable members of the Awoonor families

Awoonor-Renner and Awunor-Renner families
Dr William Awunor-Renner – prominent doctor who served as acting Principal Medical Officer and one-time Mayor of Freetown
Peter Awoonor-Renner – distinguished lawyer and leader of the Gold Coast Bar
William Awoonor-Renner III – lawyer in Freetown and the Gold Coast
Dr Edward 'Teddy' Awunor-Renner – distinguished doctor and the first African director of medical services in Sierra Leone
Dr Kenneth Bernard Awoonor-Renner – prominent medical doctor
Bankole Awoonor-Renner (1898–1970) – journalist
William Roland Awunor-Renner – lawyer and judge
Walter Awoonor-Renner – doctor based in Freetown
Raymond Awoonor-Renner – prominent lawyer based in Freetown

Awoonor-Williams family
Kofi Awoonor (1935–2013) 
George Brigars Williams (1929–2016)

Sources
Adelaide Cromwell, An African Victorian Feminist: The Life and Times of Adelaide Smith Casely Hayford 1848-1960
"William Awoonor-Renner", The Equiano Centre, UCL.

 
Christian families
Literary families
Medical families
People from Freetown
Scientific families
Sierra Leone Creole families
Sierra Leone Creole people